Nadeem Moosa (born 8 December 1962) is a Pakistani former cricketer. He played 29 first-class and 23 List A matches for several domestic teams in Pakistan between 1983 and 1996.

See also
 List of Pakistan Automobiles Corporation cricketers

References

External links
 

1962 births
Living people
Pakistani cricketers
Karachi Blues cricketers
Karachi Greens cricketers
Karachi Whites cricketers
Pakistan Automobiles Corporation cricketers
Cricketers from Karachi